Robert or Bob Dawson may refer to:

Academia
Robert MacGregor Dawson (1895–1958), Canadian political scientist and academic
Robert L. Dawson (1943–2007), American professor of French language and literature
Robert Dawson (photographer) (born 1950), American photographer and instructor of photography

Politics and government
Robert Peel Dawson (1818–1877), Irish Member of Parliament for Londonderry
Robert T. Dawson (born 1938), U.S. federal judge
Robert K. Dawson (public official) (born 1946), U.S. Assistant Secretary of the Army (Civil Works)

Sports
Bob Dawson (footballer) (born 1921), Australian rules footballer for St Kilda
Bob Dawson (Canadian football) (1932–2017), Canadian football player
Bobby Dawson (1935–1980), English footballer
Robert Dawson (footballer) (born 1963), Scottish footballer
Robert Dawson (wrestler) (born 1963), Canadian freestyle wrestler
Bobby Dawson (Canadian football) (born 1966), Canadian football player
Robert Dawson (cricketer) (born 1970), English cricketer

Other people
Robert Dawson (bishop) (1589–1643), Anglican bishop in Ireland
Robert Dawson Esq. (1782–1866), AA Co. company agent and pastoralist
Robert K. Dawson (surveyor) (1798–1861), English surveyor and cartographer
W. R. A. Dawson (1891–1918), known as Bob, British Army officer in the First World War
Bob Dawson (television host) (1924–2014), American television personality, meteorologist, and producer
Bob Dawson (actor) (c. 1955–2001), Canadian actor and radio personality